Lotan (Lōṭān), the eldest son of Seir the Horite, was the first-listed of seven chief of the Horites in the land of Seir in Genesis 36. He had two sons, Hori and Hemam. Esau's son Eliphaz married Lotan's sister Timna, who gave birth to Amalek.

The kibbutz Lotan in Israel is named after him.

References
 Butler, Trent C. Editor.. "Entry for 'LOTAN'". "Holman Bible Dictionary". <http://www.studylight.org/dic/hbd/view.cgi?number=T3926>. 1991.
 Orr, James, M.A., D.D. General Editor. "Entry for 'TIMNA'". "International Standard Bible Encyclopedia". <http://www.studylight.org/enc/isb/view.cgi?number=T8786>. 1915.
 Orr, James, M.A., D.D. General Editor. "Entry for 'LOTAN'". "International Standard Bible Encyclopedia". <http://www.studylight.org/enc/isb/view.cgi?number=T5583>. 1915.
 Genesis 36
 I Chronicles 1:38

Book of Genesis people